Joshua Ratoon Sands (May 13, 1795 – October 2, 1883) was an officer in the United States Navy who rose to the rank of Rear Admiral. He served in the War of 1812, the Mexican–American War, and the Civil War.

Early life
Sands was born in Brooklyn, New York in 1795, the son of Joshua Sands (1757–1835), who served as a U.S. Representative and Collector of the Port of New York.  His mother, Ann Ayscough Sands (1761–1851), was the daughter of Richard Ayscough, a surgeon in the British Army. St. Ann's Church, the first Episcopal church in Brooklyn, was named in her honor.

Career
Sands was preparing to enter Columbia College when the War of 1812 broke out. He entered the United States Navy as acting midshipman in the Lake Ontario squadron under Commodore Isaac Chauncey. He was commissioned a Lieutenant in 1818.

He was on recruiting duty from 1830 to 1840 and was promoted to the rank of Commander in 1841.

He was involved in the capture of Alvarado, Tabasco, and Laguna, briefly serving as Governor of Laguna. He also aided in the Siege of Veracruz and the capture of Tampico and Tuxpan in 1847. Sands received various commendations for his role in these engagements.

He was involved with laying the transatlantic telegraph cable in 1857, as well as the engagement against the filibusters of William Walker at Nicaragua. He commanded the Brazil Squadron on the Congress from 1859 to 1861.

In 1861, Sands was transferred to the retired list, and he was promoted in retirement to Commodore in 1862 and Rear Admiral in 1866. He continued active duty, serving as Union lighthouse inspector on Lakes Erie and Ontario and the Saint Lawrence River during the Civil War, and as port admiral at Norfolk, Virginia from 1869 to 1872.

Personal life
Sands was first married in 1824 to Mary Stevens (1799–1825), daughter of the engineer and inventor John Stevens of Hoboken, New Jersey. They had one son before her death. In 1830, he married Mary's younger sister, Harriet Stevens (1801–1844). They had eight children together. In 1847, he married his third wife, Eleanor Ann Crook (1828–1882), in Baltimore. They had three children.

He died in Baltimore, Maryland in 1883 at the age of 88. At the time of his death he was senior officer of the Navy on the retired list. He was buried at Green-Wood Cemetery in Brooklyn.

References

External links
 

People from Brooklyn
United States Navy personnel of the War of 1812
American military personnel of the Mexican–American War
United States Navy admirals
Burials at Green-Wood Cemetery
1795 births
1883 deaths